Jean Bachelet (8 November 1894–1977) was a French cinematographer who started as a newsreel cameraman and whose numerous theatrical films include The Rules of the Game (1939) for Jean Renoir.

Selected filmography

 Mandrin (1924)
 The Whirlpool of Fate (1925)
 Nana (1926)
 Marquitta (1927)
 The Little Match Girl (1928)
 The Queen's Necklace (1929)
 Levy and Company (1930)
 Little Lise (1930)
 Abduct Me (1932)
 Companion Wanted (1932)
 Two in a Car (1932)
 Three on a Honeymoon (1932)
 Honeymoon Trip (1933)
 Mademoiselle Josette, My Woman (1933)
 Madame Bovary (1934)
 Fanfare of Love (1935)
 Pasteur (1935)
 Nitchevo (1936)
 The Crime of Monsieur Lange (1936)
 Moutonnet (1936)
 The New Testament (1936)
 The Two Boys (1936)
 Compliments of Mister Flow (1936)
 Désiré (1937)
 The Secrets of the Red Sea (1937)
 Monsieur Coccinelle (1938)
 Berlingot and Company (1939)
 The Rules of the Game (1939)
 The Midnight Sun (1943)
 My First Love (1945)
 The Murderer Is Not Guilty (1946)
 Criminal Brigade (1947)
 The Ironmaster (1948)
 The Ladies in the Green Hats (1949)
 La Poison (1951)
 Boum sur Paris (1953)
 The Virtuous Scoundrel (1953)

References

External links 
 

1894 births
1977 deaths
French cinematographers